Star City may refer to:

Places

Canada
Rural Municipality of Star City No. 428, Saskatchewan
Star City, Saskatchewan
Star City,  the original proposed name of Sewall, British Columbia

Russia
Star City, Russia
Yuri Gagarin Cosmonaut Training Center located in Star City, Russia which is also referred to as "Star City"

United States
Star City, Arkansas
Star City, Illinois
Star City, Indiana
Lafayette, Indiana or Star City
Presque Isle, Maine or Star City
Star City, Michigan
Lincoln, Nebraska or Star City
Star City, Nevada
Miamisburg, Ohio or Ohio's Star City
Roanoke, Virginia
Star City, West Virginia

Other uses
Star City (amusement park), a theme park in Pasay, Philippines
Star City (shopping mall), a shopping complex in Seoul, South Korea
Star City, Birmingham, an entertainment complex in Birmingham, United Kingdom
Star City (comics),  a fictional city in DC comic books
The Star, Sydney or Star City Casino, a casino in Sydney, Australia
"Star City 2046", an episode of Legends of Tomorrow
"Star City 2040", an episode of Arrow

See also
"City of Stars", a song from the 2016 film La La Land
Roanoke, Virginia or Star City of the South